The 1910 Rock Island Independents season was the team's fourth season in existence, and last until 1912. The season resulted in the team posting an undefeated 5–0 record.

Schedule

References

Rock Island Independents seasons
Rock Island
Rock Island